Wolves of Vinland is a Norse neopagan group based in the outskirts of Lynchburg, Virginia. In 2018, the Southern Poverty Law Center added the Wolves of Vinland to its list of hate groups.

History 
The Wolves of Vinland raised $3000 on GoFundMe to purchase materials for a Viking-style longhall, and accepted donations from white nationalist organizations such as Counter Currents Publishing. Members of the group routinely post photos of ritual animal slaughter on Instagram. Prior to his resignation from the organization in late 2018, author Jack Donovan was an outspoken supporter of the Wolves, along with Kevin DeAnna, the founder of the now defunct Youth for Western Civilization. One member of the group, Maurice "Hjalti" Michaely, served two years in prison after being found guilty of attempted church arson against the Mount Pleasant Baptist Church, a historic black church in Gainesville, Virginia. The fire did not injure anyone but did cause $1 million in damage. After his arrest, group members began wearing T-shirts that said "Free Hjalti".

The group has been compared to Chuck Palahniuk's novel Fight Club and its film adaptation, and members have quoted the work as an influence, specifically the story's antihero Tyler Durden.  Members of the group have been associated with the white power music and black metal scenes in Baltimore, Maryland and elsewhere.

In 2022, two men with ties to Wolves of Vinland and the Asatru Folk Assembly were arrested and charged with plotting to rob a bank. They reportedly ran a Telegram channel that engaged in militant accelerationist rhetoric.

Controversies 
The Southern Poverty Law Center lists the Wolves of Vinland as a "neo-Volkisch hate group" and as a "white nationalist group".

References

External links
The group's official website

Environmental organizations based in Virginia
White supremacist groups in the United States
Alt-right organizations
Germanic neopagan organisations
Modern pagan organizations based in the United States
Modern pagan organizations established in the 2000s